Narayanpur is a village in Parsa block, Saran district of Bihar, India.  the 2011 Census of India, it had a population of 1,216 across 179 households.

References 

Villages in Saran district